Chen Yang (born 10 July 1991) is a Chinese track and field athlete who competes in the discus throw. She represented her country at the 2016 Rio Olympics, finishing seventh in the final. Her personal best is ,set in 2018.<ref>Yang Chen. All-Athletics.

International competitions

References

External links

Living people
1991 births
Chinese female discus throwers
Olympic athletes of China
Athletes (track and field) at the 2016 Summer Olympics
Athletes (track and field) at the 2018 Asian Games
Asian Games gold medalists for China
Asian Games medalists in athletics (track and field)
Medalists at the 2018 Asian Games
Asian Games gold medalists in athletics (track and field)
Athletes (track and field) at the 2020 Summer Olympics
21st-century Chinese women